Carl Arlington Gilbert (February 20, 1892 – June 21, 1972) was an American football coach.  Gilbert was the head football coach at Allegheny College in Meadville, Pennsylvania. He held that position for the 1918 season. His coaching record at Allegheny was 2–1.  He was an alumnus of Allegheny College. He died at a hospital in 1972.

References

External links
 

1892 births
1972 deaths
Allegheny Gators football coaches
Allegheny College alumni
People from Wilkinsburg, Pennsylvania